William Suter Yeatman (March 10, 1839 – April 20, 1901) was a baseball player for the Washington Nationals of the National Association in 1872. He only played one game in his career, playing right field for the Nationals on April 20, 1872. He was born in Alexandria, Virginia and died in York, Pennsylvania.

References

External links

Washington Nationals (NA) players
1839 births
1901 deaths
Baseball players from Virginia
19th-century baseball players
Sportspeople from Alexandria, Virginia